Yvonne Marie Fritz  (born September 17, 1950) is a Canadian politician and former member of the Legislative Assembly of Alberta representing the constituency of Calgary-Cross as a Progressive Conservative.

She designed the flag of Calgary along with Gwin Clark.

Early life

Fritz was born September 17, 1950 in Saskatoon. Prior to entering politics, she worked as a Registered Nurse at Calgary General Hospital for 20 years.

Political life

Fritz first sought public office in the 1986 Calgary municipal by-election for Ward 5 and was defeated in a very close race by Jon Havelock but was elected in the 1988 general election as the alderman for Ward 5. She served in that capacity until 1993 when she sought the position of MLA for the new constituency of Calgary-Cross. In the 1993 Alberta general election, Fritz was the successful candidate receiving 60% of the vote. In the subsequent elections in 1997 and 2001, she proved successful again, receiving 67% and 75% of the vote respectively. While sitting as a Private Member, she served on the Treasury Board and chaired both the Alberta Multicultural Commission and the Women's Breast Cancer Screening Council. She also sponsored three important Private Members' Bills, including a bill for mandatory bicycle helmet use for children and teenagers.

In the 2004 provincial election, Fritz secured her position as MLA for Calgary-Cross for a fourth time with 58% of the vote. Following the election, she was appointed as Minister for Seniors and Community Supports, a position she held until 2006. That year, Fritz became Chair of the Cabinet Policy Committee for Managing Growth Pressures. In 2007, Premier Stelmach appointed her as Associate Minister of Affordable Housing and Urban Development. In the 2008 provincial election, Fritz received 57% of the vote. In April 2008, she was sworn in as Minister of the newly created ministry of Housing and Urban Affairs.

Personal life

Fritz is married to Lanny. The couple has two grown children. She has been a resident of the Pineridge community in Calgary for more than 33 years.

Election results

References

1950 births
Calgary city councillors
Women municipal councillors in Canada
Living people
Politicians from Saskatoon
Progressive Conservative Association of Alberta MLAs
Women MLAs in Alberta
Members of the Executive Council of Alberta
21st-century Canadian politicians
21st-century Canadian women politicians
Women government ministers of Canada